Gozar Planners Phils., Inc. is an Philippine architectural and engineering design consultancy firm based in Asia-Pacific region. They provide   structural engineering services on all types of large projects throughout the Philippines. and in China

The firm provides  Arts & Crafts, Construction & Decoration, Electrical & Electronics, Furniture & Furnishing, Lights & Lighting, Transportation. Their expertise is engineering architecture which currently includes nine high-rise buildings including the first class residential condominium project of The Metrobank Group at the reclamation area along Roxas Blvd., Manila, the Bay Gardens. Enrique Gozar, the owner of the company graduated from University of Santo Tomas and founded  the companyin 2001.

Notable buildings
Duty Free complex (1996 )
Axxa Life Tower, Ayala Ave., Makati
Aspac Tower, Shanghai, China
GT Tower, Ayala Ave., Makati
Bay Gardens Phase 2
 Shanghai Residential & Office Condos
Valencia Hills Residential
Ocean Tower Residential Condo, Roxas Blvd.
The Metrobank Center, Cebu
The Metrobank Center, Ortigas
Forum Intercontinenta Hotel, Shenzhen
Tiarra Hotel, Makati
Furama Hotel, Dalian, China
Sunrise Delta Hotel, Makati
Tiarra Oriental Hotel, Makati
Forum Hotel, Shenzhen, China
Kempinski Hotel, Hongkong
Dalian Hotel, Dalian, China
Ramada Hotel, Guilin, China

See also
Limketkai Hotel

References

Architecture firms of the Philippines
Companies based in San Juan, Metro Manila
Companies established in 1986